Red of the Yew Tree is a Canadian animated short film, directed by Marie-Hélène Turcotte and released in 2016.

The film was shortlisted for Best Animated Short at the 5th Canadian Screen Awards.

References

External links 
 

2016 animated films
2016 films
Canadian animated short films
Quebec films
2010s Canadian films